Mosquito 109 is an Indian reserve of the Mosquito, Grizzly Bear's Head, Lean Man First Nations in Saskatchewan. It is 27 kilometres south of North Battleford. In the 2016 Canadian Census, it recorded a population of 478 living in 107 of its 113 total private dwellings. In the same year, its Community Well-Being index was calculated at 42 of 100, compared to 58.4 for the average First Nations community and 77.5 for the average non-Indigenous community.

References

Indian reserves in Saskatchewan
Division No. 12, Saskatchewan